Siol Anmchada was a sub-kingdom or lordship of Uí Maine, in an area of the west of Ireland which is now part of Connacht.  It was ruled by an offshoot of the Ui Maine called the Síol Anmchadha ("the seed of Anmchadh"), from whom the territory took its name. Some of them were also Kings of Hy-Many.

Kings of Síol Anmchadha

 Cú Connacht mac Dundach, 1006
 Madudan mac Gadhra Mór, 1008
 Gadhra Mór mac Dundach, 1008–1027
 Dogra mac Dúnadach, killed 1027
 Dunadach mac Cú Connacht, 1027–1032
 Diarmaid mac Madudan, 1032–1069
 Madudan Reamhar Ua Madadhan, 1069–1096
 Gillafin Mac Coulahan/Giolla Finn mac Ullacháin, 1096–1101
 Diarmaid Ua Madadhan, 1101–1135
 Cú Coirne Ua Madudhan, 1135–1158
 Madudan Mór Ua Madadhan, 1158–?
 Melaghlin Ua Madadhan, ?–1188
 Diarmaid Cleirech Ua Madadhan, 1188–1207
 Madudan Óg Ó Madadhan, 1207–1235 
 Cathal Ó Madadhan, 1235–1286

Lords of Síol Anmchadha
 Murchadh Ó Madadhan, 1286–1327
 Eoghan Ó Madadhan, 1327–1347
 Murchadh Ó Madadhain, 1347–1371
 Eoghan Mór Ó Madadhan, 1371–1410
 Murcadh Ó Madadhan, 1410–1451
 Eoghan Carrach Ó Madadhan, 1451–?
 Murchadh Reagh Ó Madadhan, ?–1475
 Owen Ó Madadhan, 1475–c. 1479
 Breasal Ó Madadhan, c. 1479–1526
 Domhnall Ó Madadhan, 1567–1612
 Anmchadh Ó Madadhan, 1612–1636

Chiefs of the Name

 Domhnall mac Sean Ua Madadhan/Donald Madden, 1567–1612
 Ambrose Madden, 1612–1636
 John Madden, 1636–1677?
 Colonel Daniel Madden, c. 1677–1727
 Breasal Madden, 1727–1745
 Ambrose Madden, 1745–c. 1791
 Ambrose Madden of Streamstown, alive 1810
 Breasal Madden of Eyrecourt
 Ambrose Madden of Buffalo City, USA
 Walter Madden of Buffalo City, USA, alive 1902

References

 http://www.rootsweb.ancestry.com/~irlkik/ihm/uimaine.htm
 Annals of Ulster at CELT: Corpus of Electronic Texts at University College Cork
 Annals of Tigernach at CELT: Corpus of Electronic Texts at University College Cork
 Revised edition of McCarthy's synchronisms at Trinity College Dublin.
 Irish Kings and High-Kings, Francis John Byrne, Dublin (1971;2003) Four Courts Press, 
 History of the O'Maddens of Hy-Many, Gerard Madden, 2004. .
 The Life, Legends and Legacy of Saint Kerrill: A Fifth-Century East Galway Evangelist by Joseph Mannion, 2004. 
 http://www.ucc.ie/celt/published/G105007/index.html

Siol Anmchada
Siol Anmchada